The Civic Coalition (KO) is a catch-all political alliance in Poland. The alliance was formed around Civic Platform in opposition to the ruling Law and Justice (PiS) party. The coalition's name uses a play on words with Ja Obywatel, which translates to "I, [a] Citizen".

History
The Civic Coalition was originally created by the Civic Platform and Modern parties for 2018 local elections. In June 2019, it was announced that the Civic Coalition would be slated to participate in the 2019 Polish parliamentary election and Civic Platform and Modern will form a joint parliamentary club. The Greens announced at the end of July 2019 that they will participate in the elections as part of the Coalition. In August 2019, the Silesian Autonomy Movement and other member organisations of the Silesian Electoral Agreement joined the Coalition.

2018 local elections and present 
In the 2018 local elections, the Civic Coalition received 26.97% of votes (second place after Law and Justice), winning 194 seats. In 8 voivodships, it obtained the best result, and in the Pomerania the majority of seats. The coalition fared worse in the powiat and mayoral election. In the first round of 11 candidates of the Civic Coalition won elections for mayors of cities (including Rafał Trzaskowski in Warsaw). In addition, 15 candidates of the Civic Coalition went through to the second round, of which 8 were elected. Candidates of Civic Coalition were elected presidents of 19 cities, while it was placed second to the national-conservative Law and Justice in 4.

The committee has shown stronger electoral performances in large cities, such as, Warsaw, Poznań, Gdańsk, Wrocław, Łódź, and Kraków. Better than average results were achieved in West and North Poland (Recovered Territories). In the Opole Voivodeship, Civic Coalition received high support among the German minority. However, it has weaker support in the villages and in the conservative Eastern Poland.

In the 2019 parliamentary elections, the Coalition received most of its votes in major cities (as in 2018 local elections) and areas surrounding them.

Ideology 
The Civic Coalition is a catch-all coalition, that is made up of political parties that occupy political positions from the centre-left to the centre-right, although media and academics have also described the coalition as centre-left, centrist, and centre-right. It is mainly orientated towards the principles of liberalism, and it aims to protect liberal democracy in Poland. It supports Poland's membership in the European Union and NATO.

Composition

Electoral performance

Sejm

Senate

Presidential

2018 local

See also 
 European Coalition
 Polish Coalition

Notes and references

Notes

References 

2018 establishments in Poland
Christian democratic parties in Europe
Conservative parties in Poland
Liberal parties in Poland
Political parties established in 2018
Political party alliances in Poland